Wiesent is a river of Bavaria, Germany. It is a tributary of the Danube, that it enters through the oxbow Alte Donau between Wörth an der Donau and Niederachdorf.

See also
List of rivers of Bavaria

Notes and references

Rivers of Bavaria
Rivers of Germany